James Alexander Glancy,  (born August 1982) is a British television presenter and conservationist. He formerly served as a member of the Royal Marine Commandos and was a Brexit Party Member of the European Parliament (MEP) for South West England from 2019 to 2020.

Early life and education
Glancy was born in Surrey in 1982. Glancy studied history at St Anne's College, Oxford. He was captain of the university's boxing team. He was sponsored through university by the Royal Marines.

Military service
Glancy served in the Royal Marines and the Special Boat Service (SBS). In March 2013, he was awarded the Conspicuous Gallantry Cross (CGC) "in recognition of gallant and distinguished services in Afghanistan during the period 1 April 2012 to 30 September 2012". The CGC is a second level UK honour, with only the Victoria Cross ranking higher for combat gallantry. He completed three tours of Afghanistan.

Television and conservation
Glancy presented the environmental show Planet SOS on the Mail Plus and hosts documentaries on National Geographic and the Discovery Channel, including Shark Week.

Political career
Glancy stood as a candidate in the 2019 European Parliament election for the Brexit Party. He was placed at number two on his party's list and was elected as one of its three MEPs in the South West England constituency alongside Ann Widdecombe and Christina Jordan.

References

External links
 Official Website
 European Parliament – Profile 
 James Glancy on Twitter
 James Glancy on Facebook
 James Glancy on Instagram

Living people
1982 births
MEPs for England 2019–2020
Brexit Party MEPs
Royal Marines Commando officers
Recipients of the Conspicuous Gallantry Cross
Special Boat Service officers
Royal Navy personnel of the War in Afghanistan (2001–2021)
21st-century English politicians
Alumni of St Anne's College, Oxford
British conservationists
British television presenters
People from Surrey
Military personnel from Surrey